The 2020 American Samoa gubernatorial election was held on November 3, 2020, coinciding with the 2020 United States presidential elections and other United States elections. Incumbent Governor of American Samoa Lolo Matalasi Moliga was not eligible for reelection due to term limits. In American Samoa, gubernatorial candidates run on a non-partisan basis and as a slate together with their Lieutenant Governor of American Samoa candidate.

In the 2020 election, the previous lieutenant governor Lemanu Peleti Mauga was elected governor and the former attorney general, Salo Ale, was elected lieutenant governor with more than 60 percent of the vote. Both were affiliated with the Democratic Party and beat two non-partisan tickets, while the candidate affiliated with the Republican Party, Nuanuaolefeagaiga Saoluaga T. Nua, only placed fourth.

Candidates
Four political tickets qualified for the 2020 election. Although candidates do affiliate with national political parties, the gubernatorial election is held on a nonpartisan basis.

Gaoteote Palaie Tofau, President of the American Samoa Senate
 Running mate: Faiivae Iuli Alex Godinet, state senator
Iaulualo Faafetai Talia, executive director of the American Samoa Government's Employee Retirement Fund
 Running mate: Tapaau Dr. Dan Mageo Aga, director of the American Samoa Government's Office of Political Status, Constitutional Review and Federal Relations
Lemanu Peleti Mauga, Lieutenant Governor of American Samoa, affiliated with the Democratic Party
 Running mate: Salo Ale, former Attorney General of American Samoa
Nuanuaolefeagaiga Saoluaga T. Nua, state senator and former Speaker of the American Samoa House of Representatives, affiliated with the Republican Party
 Running mate: Tapumanaia Galu Satele Jr., former state representative

Not-qualified candidates
Fatumalala L. A. Al-Shehri, Independent candidate for American Samoa's at-large congressional district in 2012, had announced plans to run with Leah A. Smith, missionary for the Assembly of God Church, as her running mate on the first all-woman ticket, but they were not on the list of qualified candidates released by the American Samoa Election Office after the filing deadline.

Campaign
On January 25, 2019, Senator Nuanuaolefeagaiga announced his candidacy.

I’aulualo Fa’afetai Talia announced his candidacy at a campaign news media event at Sadie's by the Sea on July 28, 2019.

Gaoteote Palaie Tofau announced his candidacy on February 9, 2020.

General election

References

2020 American Samoa elections
2020 in American Samoa
American Samoa
American Samoa gubernatorial elections
Non-partisan elections
November 2020 events in Oceania